Bartolomé Martinez Menacho y Mesa (Mechado) (1517 – February 16, 1604) was a Roman Catholic prelate who served as Archbishop of Santafé en Nueva Granada (1593–1604)
and Bishop of Panamá (1587–1593).

Biography
Bartolomé Martinez Menacho y Mesa was born in Torre de Miguel Sesmero, Spain and ordained a priest in the Order of Preachers.
He went to Peru where he served as archdeacon of the Cathedral of Lima. 
On April 27, 1587, Pope Sixtus V, appointed him Bishop of Panamá. 
On September 4, 1588, he was consecrated bishop by Turibius of Mogrovejo, Archbishop of Lima with Antonio Avendaño y Paz, Bishop of Concepción assisting. 
His term in Panama was marked by good relations with the government authorities with little meddling in church affairs; he also defended the Black population and prevented their harsh punishment after a rebellion. 
On April 30, 1593, Pope Clement VIII, appointed him the Archbishop of Santafé en Nueva Granada where he served until his death on February 16, 1604 in Cartagena.

References

External links and additional sources
 (for Chronology of Bishops) 
 (for Chronology of Bishops) 
 (for Chronology of Bishops) 
 (for Chronology of Bishops) 

1604 deaths
1517 births
Bishops appointed by Pope Sixtus V
Bishops appointed by Pope Clement VIII
Dominican bishops
16th-century Roman Catholic bishops in Panama
16th-century Roman Catholic bishops in New Granada
Roman Catholic bishops of Panamá
Roman Catholic archbishops of Bogotá